La Mujer de mi padre ("My Father's Woman", also translatable as "My Father's Mistress") is a 1968 Argentine sexploitation drama film directed by Armando Bó and starring Isabel Sarli, Victor Bó and Armando Bó.

Cast

References

External links
 

1968 films
Argentine drama films
1960s Spanish-language films
Films directed by Armando Bó
1960s Argentine films